Me Sang is a district located in Prey Veng Province, in south eastern Cambodia.

References

Districts of Prey Veng province